North Louth was a parliamentary constituency in Ireland, which returned one Member of Parliament (MP) to the House of Commons of the Parliament of the United Kingdom, elected on a system of first-past-the-post, from 1885 to 1918. Prior to the 1885 general election and after the dissolution of Parliament in 1918 the area was part of the Louth constituency.

Boundaries
This constituency comprised the northern part of County Louth. The seat was defined under the Redistribution of Seats Act 1885 as comprising the baronies of Louth, Lower Dundalk and Upper Dundalk, and that part of the barony of Ardee contained within the parishes of Killany and Louth.

Members of Parliament

Elections

Elections in the 1880s

Elections in the 1890s

Elections in the 1900s

Elections in the 1910s

The general election result was overturned by petition.

Roche's death prompts a by-election.

References

Debrett's Guide to the House of Commons and Judicial Bench, 1918

Westminster constituencies in County Louth (historic)
Constituencies of the Parliament of the United Kingdom established in 1885
Constituencies of the Parliament of the United Kingdom disestablished in 1918